Hogan's Alley may refer to

Popular culture
 Hogan's Alley (comic strip), an 1890s comic strip that featured the character The Yellow Kid
 Hogan's Alley (video game), a 1984 video game from Nintendo
 Hogan's Alley (magazine), a magazine about the cartoon arts

 Hoagie's Alley is the place where Top Cat lives, a pun on Hogan's Alley
 Hogan's Alley (film), a lost 1925 Warner Brothers film starring Monte Blue
 Hogan's Alley is where the Dugan family lives in the early continuity of the Depression era comic strip Show Girl (later named after its lead character Dixie Dugan).

Places
 Hogan's Alley (FBI), an FBI training facility located in Quantico, Virginia
 Hogan's Alley (Vancouver), a nickname for an alley between Prior and Union streets in Vancouver that had been the city's small African-Canadian neighbourhood and jazz district until demolished for an off-ramp for the Georgia Viaduct
 "Hogan's Alley", a nickname for the Riviera Country Club because of Ben Hogan's success there
 "Hogan's Alley", a nickname for the Colonial Country Club because of Ben Hogan's success there in the annual PGA Tour event, which he won a record five times
 "Hogan's Alley", name for a berthing space located in the After Battery Compartment of a World War II diesel electric submarine.